The Hanish Islands is an archipelago in the Red Sea consisting of a trio of major islands at the centre of an array of smaller islets and rocks. The three major islands are the northern Zuqar Island, the southern Great Anish (Al-anīsh al-Kabīr), and the significantly smaller Little Anish (Al-anīsh al-Ṣaghīr) in between. The archipelago is largely under the control of Yemen, with only several small south-western rocks and islets granted to Eritrea following the Hanish Islands conflict in 1996.

History 

The Ottoman Empire exercised claim over the Hanish archipelago until its dissolution following World War I, after which the sovereignty and political status of the islands were left indeterminate by the 1923 Treaty of Lausanne. Italy exercised loose control over the fishermen frequenting the archipelago through its geographical proximity to Italian Eritrea, until the country's occupation by the British in 1915 to "forestall the Italians".

The islands were administered by the Italian Empire until 1941, when the Italian colonists surrendered to the British, who subsequently awarded all of Eritrea, including the archipelago, to the neighbouring Ethiopia.

Eritrean independence groups used the archipelago, particularly Zuqar Island, as a base for attacks on Ethiopian military interests, leading to the Ethiopian desire for control over the archipelago.

Eritrea succeeded in gaining its independence in 1991, and subsequently began attempts to negotiate and exercise sovereignty over the archipelago, particularly Great Anish. The breakdown of peaceful negotiations with Yemen in 1996 resulted in the Hanish Islands conflict, a territorial war that would last two years. In 1998, both countries agreed to accept arbitration, after which the Permanent Court of Arbitration determined that the archipelago belonged to Yemen, only granting several small islands and islets to Eritrean sovereignty. The conflict ultimately claimed the lives of 4-15 Yemenis and twelve Eritreans.

The archipelago would become the scene of intense fighting during the 2015 Yemeni Civil War, when forces loyal to former president Ali Abdullah Saleh and Houthi insurgents on one side fought against forces loyal to acting president Abd Rabbuh Mansur Hadi, backed by Gulf Arab coalition forces, on the other.

See also 
 Zuqar Island

References 

Islands of Eritrea
Islands of the Red Sea
Islands of Yemen
Territorial disputes of Eritrea
Territorial disputes of Yemen